Cryptachaea riparia is a spider species with Palearctic distribution. It is notably found in Lithuania.

See also 
 List of Theridiidae species

References 

Theridiidae
Spiders of Europe
Spiders described in 1834
Palearctic spiders